Floriana Tuna is a Romanian chemist and a Senior Research Fellow in the Department of Chemistry at The University of Manchester. Her research in general is based on inorganic chemistry and magnetochemistry, specifically on molecular magnetism, EPR spectroscopy and quantum computing.

Education 
Floriana completed her Bachelor of Science at University of Bucharest. She continued to read her Master of Science degree at University of Bucharest and successfully completed it in 1989 before moving to the Institute of Physical Chemistry of the Romanian Academy to read her Doctor of Philosophy degree in transition metal chemistry, which was completed in 1997 and was supervised by Prof. Marius Andruh and Prof. Luminita Patron.

Research and career 

Upon graduation, Floriana completed her postdoctoral research in Molecular Magnetism with Dr. Jean-Pascal Sutter at Institut de Chimie de la Matière Condensée de Bordeauxwith (ICMCB), France and also as a visiting  Deutscher Akademischer Austauschdienst (DAAD) Fellow at University of Heidelberg, Germany. She then received a Marie Curie Individual Fellowship at University of Warwick to work in supramolecular chemistry before moving to University of Manchester in 2003 as a Researcher. She was later promoted to the position of Senior Researcher. She is currently part of the Molecular Magnetism group at University of Manchester, working along with Prof. David Collison, Nicholas F. Chilton, Grigore Timco and Richard Winpenny. 

Floriana's research in general is based on inorganic chemistry and magnetochemistry, specifically on molecular magnetism, EPR spectroscopy and quantum computing.

Notable work 

In 2019, Floriana participated in a research which reported the capability of a MFI-type zeolite (NbAlS-1) could be used to convert aqueous solutions of γ-valerolactone (GVL) (obtained from biomass-derived carbohydrates) into butenes with a yield of more than 99% at ambient pressure under continuous flow conditions. The conversion of the renewable biomass into butenes offered the prospect for the sustainable production of butene as a platform chemical for the manufacture of renewable materials. 

In 2019, she participated in a research which showed the capability to use a porous metal–organic framework (MOF) to provide a selective, fully reversible and repeatable capability to capture nitrogen dioxide (NO2), a toxic air pollutant produced particularly by diesel and bio-fuel use. The NO2 can then be easily converted into nitric acid, an industry with a wide range of uses including, agricultural fertilizer for crops; rocket propellant and nylon.

In 2016, Floriana confirmed the capability to use pulsed EPR spectroscopy to measure the covalency of actinide complexes in a research in collaboration with Eric McInnes and David P. Mills at the University of Manchester. Prior to this research, the extent of covalency in actinide complexes was less understood as this nature of bonding was not studied due to limited technology and methods of experimentation at the time. The use of pulsed EPR spectroscopy was able to determine the covalency of thorium(III) and Uranium(III) complexes for the first time and this paved the way to further research on the use of these complexes in the separation and recycling of nuclear waste.

Awards and nominations 
 Romanian Academy 'Ilie Murgulescu' Award (2005)

Major publications

References

External links
 Floriana Tuna at University of Manchester

Living people
Year of birth missing (living people)
21st-century chemists
Academics of the University of Manchester
University of Bucharest alumni
Inorganic chemists
Romanian chemists
Romanian women scientists
Romanian emigrants to the United Kingdom
Romanian expatriates in England